Markle is a town in Huntington and Wells counties, in the U.S. state of Indiana. The population was 1,071 at the 2020 census. It lies along Interstate 69, U.S. Route 224, State Road 116 and State Road 3.

History
Markle was laid out in 1836, but did not prosper until the railroad was extended to that point some time later.

The Markle post office has been in operation since 1852.

Geography
Markle is located at  (40.826477, -85.338076).  The Wabash River flows through the south edge of the town.

Demographics

2010 census
As of the census of 2010, there were 1,095 people, 433 households, and 282 families living in the town. The racial makeup of the town was 98.3% White, 0.8% African American, 0.2% Asian, 0.1% from other races, and 0.6% from two or more races. Hispanic or Latino of any race were 1.2% of the population.

There were 433 households, of which 29.8% had children under the age of 18 living with them, 52.7% were married couples living together, 9.0% had a female householder with no husband present, 3.5% had a male householder with no wife present, and 34.9% were non-families. 31.2% of all households were made up of individuals, and 12.3% had someone living alone who was 65 years of age or older. The average household size was 2.35 and the average family size was 2.94.

The median age in the town was 43 years. 23.1% of residents were under the age of 18; 6.9% were between the ages of 18 and 24; 22.3% were from 25 to 44; 27.7% were from 45 to 64; and 20.3% were 65 years of age or older. The gender makeup of the town was 47.9% male and 52.1% female.

2000 census
As of the census of 2000, there were 1,102 people, 434 households, and 289 families living in the town. The racial makeup of the town was 99.27% White, 0.36% African American, and 0.36% from two or more races. Hispanic or Latino of any race were 0.64% of the population.

There were 434 households, out of which 28.8% had children under the age of 18 living with them, 53.7% were married couples living together, 9.7% had a female householder with no husband present, and 33.4% were non-families. 28.6% of all households were made up of individuals, and 12.0% had someone living alone who was 65 years of age or older. The average household size was 2.42 and the average family size was 2.98.

In the town, the population was spread out, with 24.3% under the age of 18, 9.4% from 18 to 24, 27.4% from 25 to 44, 20.5% from 45 to 64, and 18.3% who were 65 years of age or older. The median age was 38 years. For every 100 females, there were 90.0 males. For every 100 females age 18 and over, there were 84.9 males.

The median income for a household in the town was $37,039, and the median income for a family was $48,654. Males had a median income of $35,163 versus $20,813 for females. The per capita income for the town was $18,504. About 3.6% of families and 6.7% of the population were below the poverty line, including 9.4% of those under age 18 and 3.1% of those age 65 or over.

Education
Markle residents may obtain a free library card from the Huntington City-Township Public Library in Downtown Huntington.

References

External links
 Markle Area Chamber of Commerce

Towns in Huntington County, Indiana
Towns in Wells County, Indiana